South Korean singer and actor Seo In-guk has released one studio album, five extended plays (EPs), one single album, and fourteen singles.

Albums

Studio albums

Compilation albums

Single albums

Extended plays

Singles

As lead artist

As collaborating artist

Soundtrack appearances

Other charted songs

Writing credits
All music credits are adapted from the Korea Music Copyright Association's database, unless otherwise noted.

Videography

Music videos

Notes

References

External links
 Official Korean website 
 Official Japanese website

Discographies of South Korean artists
Pop music group discographies